Kayabaşı is a Turkish place name and it may refer to;

 Kayabaşı, Amasya a village in Amasya (central) district of Amasya Province
 Kayabaşı, Bitlis, a village
 Kayabaşı, Polatlı a village in Polatlı district of Ankara Province
 Kayabaşı, Alanya a village in Alanya district of Antalya Province
 Kayabaşı, Kale
 Kayabaşı, Kemah
 Kayabaşı, Köprüköy
 Kayabaşı, Korkuteli a village in Korkuteli district of Antalya Province
 Kayabaşı, Şavşat a village in Şavşat district of Artvin Province
 Kayabaşı, Ulus a village in Ulus district of Bartın Province
 Kayabaşı, Mengen a village in Mengen district of Bolu Province
 Kayabaşı, Göynük a village in Göynük district of Bolu Province
 Kayabaşı, Araç a village in Araç district of Kastamonu Province
 Kayabaşı, Mut a village in Mut district of Mersin Province